Ceropales maculata is a kleptoparasitic spider wasp found in the holoarctic region.

Biology
Ceropales maculata is an uncommon spider wasp. This species intercepts other spider wasps engaged in prey transport and lays its eggs in the book lung of the captured spider. C. maculata then allows the other spider wasp to return to its nest, where the C. maculata larvae hatch, eat the host egg, and consume the spider.

Spider wasps kleptoparasitised by C. maculata include species in the genera Priocnemis, Pompilus, Agenioideus, Arachnospila, Anoplius, Episyron and Auplopus in Britain and Europe. Other species of non-Pompilid solitary wasp which use spiders as prey, for example the sphecid Miscophus, may also be parasitised by C. maculata.

This species is univoltine; adults are seen from May to September.

Habitat
C. maculata can be found in sandy areas such as heathlands, coastal dunes and sand pits.

References

Hymenoptera of Europe
Ceropalinae
Insects described in 1775
Taxa named by Johan Christian Fabricius